Ubic may refer to:
 UBiC, a research centre
 Chorismate lyase, an enzyme